The Further Adventures of The Joker (1990; Bantam Books, 457 pages) is an English paperback anthology of short fiction stories about Batman's archenemy the Joker. The material was written by various authors (see below), and the book was edited by Martin H. Greenberg.  It was the follow-up to an earlier Batman anthology, The Further Adventures of Batman, and was followed by two later installments: The Further Adventures of Batman vol. 2 Featuring the Penguin and The Further Adventures of Batman vol. 3 Featuring Catwoman.

The stories in The Further Adventures of The Joker cover a wide range of topics and styles, with the title character, and his complicated relationship with the Batman, as the unifying theme; from tales of the Joker's childhood, to his current crimes, some of which Batman attempts to foil.

All of the works included in this anthology are considered to be "non-canonical", in relation to mainstream DC Comics continuity. Joe R. Lansdale's story "Belly Laugh, or The Joker's Trick or Treat" is notably a sequel to Lansdale's story from The Further Adventures of Batman.

Stories

See also 
Joker (character)

External links 
http://www.amazon.com/Further-Adventures-Joker-Martin-Greenberg/dp/0553285319/ref=ed_oe_p

1990 books
Martin H. Greenberg anthologies
Batman novels
Bantam Books books
Joker (character) titles